Kevin Mitchell (born 24 October 1961) is a former British Grand Prix motorcycle road racer. He competed in the Grand Prix world championships from 1987 to 1994. He achieved his highest ranking in 1992, riding for Harris Performance Products on a Yamaha 500cc bike, when he had 12 starts and finished 27th; his highest point total was 4, in 1988, on a 250cc Yamaha.  Two Time North West 200 winner in 1984 & 1989.

References

External links
Kevin Mitchell on MotoGP.com

Living people
1961 births
British motorcycle racers
English motorcycle racers
500cc World Championship riders
250cc World Championship riders